Hafez Mohamad Makhlouf (‎; born 2 April 1971), also known as Hafez Makhlouf, is a retired Syrian colonel and former intelligence officer who was head of the Damascus branch of the Syrian General Intelligence Directorate. He was a member of Syrian president Bashar al-Assad's "inner circle" of close supporters.

Early life
Makhlouf was born in Damascus on 2 April 1971. He is the maternal cousin of Syrian president Bashar al-Assad and the brother of Rami Makhlouf, Syria's leading businessman. He is also a cousin of Atef Najib, political security chief in the city of Daraa. He was commissioned in the Republican Guard in 1992 and was a close friend of Bassel al-Assad. Makhlouf was injured in the high-speed car crash in 1994 that killed Bashar al-Assad's elder brother, Bassel al-Assad.

Career
Makhlouf was a Colonel of the Army and the head of intelligence at the General Security Directorate's Damascus branch until 2014.

Controversy

Sanctions 
Makhlouf was sanctioned by the US Department of the Treasury in 2007 for "undermining the sovereignty of Lebanon or its democratic processes and institutions." The sanctions called for freezing "any assets the designees may have located in the United States", and prohibited U.S. persons from engaging in transactions with these individuals". Makhlouf was further sanctioned in 2011 by the United States in May, the EU in September. In November 2011 the Arab League imposed a travel ban on him.

Money laundering allegations 
Swiss authorities froze Hafez Makhlouf's account of about 3 million euros in a Geneva bank for suspected money laundering in 2011. In February 2012, Makhlouf won a legal bid to unfreeze SFr 3 million ($3.3 million) held in bank accounts in Switzerland after he appealed, saying it predated sanctions. However, his legal bid to enter Switzerland to meet with his lawyers was rejected by Switzerland's supreme court at the end of 2011.

Hafez Makhlouf reportedly bought £31 million in Moscow property through the financing network of Syrian-Russian businessman Mudalal Khoury.7g7g8h8hbi

Reports on death, and relocating to Belarus
On 18 July 2012, Al Arabiya reported that Makhlouf was killed in a bombing which targeted a meeting of the Central Crisis Management Cell (CCMC) at Syria's National Security headquarters in Damascus. Other sources, however, indicated that he was only wounded in the attack.

In September 2014, multiple sources reported that he had relocated to Belarus with his wife. Earlier in the month, Makhlouf had been removed from his powerful intelligence post in Damascus but pro-government sources said at the time that it was a "routine" move. Joshua Landis, a U.S. expert on Syria tweeted that Makhlouf had left Syria and that he and his brother Ihab had removed Assad’s photo from their Facebook pages and WhatsApp profiles.

See also
Al-Assad family

References

Syrian colonels
1971 births
Arab Socialist Ba'ath Party – Syria Region politicians
Assad family
Politicians from Damascus
People of the Syrian civil war
Survivors of terrorist attacks
Living people
People named in the Panama Papers
Syrian individuals subject to U.S. Department of the Treasury sanctions
Syrian individuals subject to the European Union sanctions